Janez Andrejašič (born 26 March 1943 in Ljubljana) is a Yugoslav retired slalom canoeist of Slovenian nationality who competed from the early 1960s to the mid-1970s. He won a silver medal in the C-2 team event at the 1965 ICF Canoe Slalom World Championships in Spittal with Jože Gerkman, and finished sixth in the C-2 event at the 1972 Summer Olympics in Munich with Peter Guzelj.

References

 Sports-reference.com profile

External links 
 Janez ANDRIJASIC at CanoeSlalom.net

1943 births
Canoeists at the 1972 Summer Olympics
Living people
Olympic canoeists of Yugoslavia
Slovenian male canoeists
Sportspeople from Ljubljana
Yugoslav male canoeists
Medalists at the ICF Canoe Slalom World Championships